"Little Things" is a song written by Billy Barber, and recorded by American country music group The Oak Ridge Boys.  It was released in March 1985 as the first single from the album Step On Out.  The song was The Oak Ridge Boys' twelfth number one country single.  The single went to number one for one week and spent a total of thirteen weeks on the country chart.

Charts

Weekly charts

Year-end charts

References

1985 singles
1985 songs
The Oak Ridge Boys songs
Song recordings produced by Ron Chancey
MCA Records singles